Mohammed Amar Al-Kathiri (born 7 December 1978) is an Omani footballer.

Career
Al-Kathiri is originally from Salalah, Oman. He was awarded the Asian Young Footballer of the Year prize by the Asian Football Confederation (AFC) in 1995. He also played at the 1995 FIFA U-17 World Championship and won the Golden Ball award for the Most Valuable Player.

During his club career, Al-Kathiri played for his hometown club, Al-Nasr, in addition to Mirbat.

References

External links

1978 births
Living people
People from Salalah
Omani footballers
Asian Young Footballer of the Year winners
Association football midfielders